Agüeybaná  (died 1510) was the principal and most powerful cacique (chief) of the Taíno people in "Borikén" (Puerto Rico) when the Spanish first arrived on the island on November 19, 1493.

Etymology
Agüeybana, which has been interpreted by 19th and 20th century authors as meaning "The Great Sun", was the hereditary title shared by the family that ruled the theocratic monarchy of Borikén, governing the hierarchy over the rest of the regional chiefs or caciques. Like other nobiliary recognitions within Taíno culture, it was passed down through the maternal bloodline. The Spanish settlers Hispanicized the title to be the equivalent of the European concept of kings, with contemporary writers such as Juan de Castellanos and Gonzalo Fernández de Oviedo y Valdés employing the title of Rey Agüeybana (English: "King Agüeybana") when referring to the second monarch to lead the Taíno during the 1510s. By the 1800s, the terms "king" and "cacique" were used exchangeably by both local and Spanish authors, but a resurgence in the interest concerning Taíno history during the 20th century led to the popularization of native words and the latter term gained more lexical prominence.

Arrival of the conquistadors 
Agüeybaná received the Spanish conquistador Juan Ponce de León upon his arrival in 1508. According to an old Taíno tradition, Agüeybaná practiced the "guatiao," a Taíno ritual in which he and Juan Ponce de León became friends and exchanged names. Ponce de León then baptized the cacique's mother into Christianity and renamed her Inés.

The cacique joined Ponce de León in the exploration of the island. After this had been accomplished, Agüeybaná accompanied the conquistador to the island of La Española (what today comprises the nations of the Dominican Republic and Haiti), where he was well received by the Governor Nicolás de Ovando. Agüeybaná's actions helped to maintain the peace between the Taíno and the Spaniards, a peace which was to be short-lived.
 
The hospitality and friendly treatment that the Spaniards received from Agüeybaná made it easy for the Spaniards to betray and conquer the island. After a short period of peace, the Taínos were forced to work in the island's gold mines and in the construction of forts as slaves. Many Taínos died as a result of the cruel treatment which they received.

Death and aftermath
Upon Agüeybaná's death in 1510, his brother Güeybaná (better known as Agüeybaná II) became the most powerful Cacique in the island. Agüeybaná II was troubled by the treatment of his people by the Spanish and attacked them in battle. The Taíno were ultimately defeated at the Battle of Yagüecas.

Taínos in Puerto Rico either abandoned the island, were forced to labor as slaves; others were killed off by Spaniard artillery- in what was thought to be, until recently, a complete extinction.

Recent genetic studies published between 2018 and 2019 revealed that Taino blood ancestry is still present in the genome of Puerto Ricans. The analyses revealed a narrative more indicative of assimilation and migrations to nearby islands rather than extinction. Although many succumbed to the smallpox epidemic that attacked the islanders in 1519, others survived the genetic bottleneck to produce progeny.

Legacy
Agüeybaná is admired in Puerto Rico for his dedication to his people and attempting to keep the peace. Puerto Rico has named many public buildings and streets after him:
 The City of Bayamón has named a high school after him.
 There is a street in Caguas that honors him.
 An avenue in the Hato Rey area of San Juan is named after Agüeybaná.
 Puerto Rico once had an equivalent to the Grammy Award which was awarded annually and was called the "Agüeybaná de Oro" (The Golden Agüeybaná), in honor of the great cacique.

Many songs and poems, by poets such as Juan Antonio Corretjer, among others, have been written about Agüeybaná.

See also 

 List of Puerto Ricans
 Agüeybaná II
 List of Taínos
 Arasibo
 Hayuya
 Jumacao
 Orocobix
 Tibes Indigenous Ceremonial Center

Notes

References

External links
 History of Puerto Rico
 

15th-century births
1510 deaths
Indigenous Caribbean people
Monarchs killed in action
Puerto Rican folklore
Puerto Rican people of Taíno descent
16th-century monarchs in North America
16th-century indigenous people of the Americas
Taíno leaders